Baldwin is an unincorporated community in western Burleigh County, North Dakota, United States. It lies along U.S. Route 83 north of the city of Bismarck, the county seat of Burleigh County. Baldwin's elevation is 1,939 feet (591 m). Baldwin has a post office with the ZIP code 58521.

Baldwin is referenced in the Highway to Heaven episode 1:23, entitled "The Right Thing." A grandfather character, played by Lew Ayres, talks about a plaque with his name "back on the wall of the YMCA in Baldwin, North Dakota." Although a railroad cuts straight through town, the grain elevators were torn down in the late 1990s or early 2000s. There were once multiple business buildings across from the grain elevators, but they were also torn down sometime between 2003 and 2005. Highway 83 bypassed the town, so there is little traffic. In 2018, the population was estimated to be less than 25. A post office and rural fire department are currently in operation, along with Baldwin greenhouse/nursery roughly 1/2 mile west of town.

References

Unincorporated communities in Burleigh County, North Dakota
Unincorporated communities in North Dakota